The 2021–22 season was the 76th season in HNK Rijeka’s history. It was their 31st successive season in the Croatian First Football League, and 48th successive top tier season.

Competitions

Overall

HT Prva liga

League table

Results summary

Results by round

Results by opponent

Source: 2021–22 Croatian First Football League article

Matches

HT Prva liga

Croatian Cup

UEFA Europa Conference League

Friendlies

Pre-season

On-season (2021)

Mid-season

On-season (2022)

Player seasonal records
Updated 26 May 2022. Competitive matches only.

Goals

Source: Competitive matches

Clean sheets

Source: Competitive matches

Disciplinary record

Source: nk-rijeka.hr

Appearances and goals

Source: nk-rijeka.hr

Suspensions

Penalties

Transfers

In

Source: Glasilo Hrvatskog nogometnog saveza

Out

Source: Glasilo Hrvatskog nogometnog saveza

Spending:  €688,000
Income:  €2,800,000
Expenditure:  €2,112,000

Notes

References

HNK Rijeka seasons
Croatian football clubs 2021–22 season
2021–22 UEFA Europa Conference League participants seasons